The 2010 United States state legislative elections were held on November 2, 2010, halfway through President Barack Obama's first term in office. Elections were held for 88 legislative chambers, with all states but Louisiana, Mississippi, New Jersey, and Virginia holding elections in at least one house. Kansas and New Mexico held elections for their lower, but not upper houses. Four territorial chambers in three territories and the District of Columbia were up as well.

Republicans scored record gains, gaining at least 680 total seats and taking control of 20 legislative chambers through election, while the Democrats lost 21 chambers. The winners of this election cycle were slated to serve in their respective legislatures for either two or four-year terms, depending on state election rules.

Republicans made substantial gains in state legislatures across the nation. Twenty chambers flipped from Democratic to Republican control, giving Republicans full control of eleven state legislatures and control of one chamber in Colorado, Iowa, and New York.1 Additionally, Republicans gained enough seats in the Oregon House of Representatives to produce a 30-30 party split, pushing Democrats into a power-sharing agreement that resulted in the election of two "co-speakers" (one from each party) to lead the chamber. Republicans gained a total of 680 seats in state legislative races, breaking the previous record of 628 flipped seats set by Democrats in the post-Watergate elections of 1974.

Six states saw both chambers switch from Democrat to Republican majorities: Alabama (where the Republicans won a majority for the first time in 136 years), Maine (for the first time since 1964), Minnesota, New Hampshire, North Carolina (for the first time since 1896), and Wisconsin. In addition, by picking up the lower chambers in Indiana, Ohio, Michigan, Montana and Pennsylvania, Republicans gained control of both chambers in an additional five states. Further, Republicans picked up one chamber from Democrats in Colorado, Iowa, and New York to split control in those states. They expanded majorities in both chambers in Texas, Florida, and Georgia. The massive Republican victories in legislative races would be widely expected to significantly impact the redrawing of congressional districts for the 2012 election cycle.

Summary table
Regularly-scheduled elections were held in 88 of the 99 state legislative chambers in the United States; nationwide, regularly-scheduled elections were held for 6,064 of the 7,383 legislative seats. Most legislative chambers held elections for all seats, but some legislative chambers that use staggered elections held elections for only a portion of the total seats in the chamber. The chambers that were not up for election either hold regularly-scheduled elections in odd-numbered years, or have four-year terms and hold all regularly-scheduled elections in presidential election years.

Note that this table only covers regularly-scheduled elections; additional special elections took place concurrently with these regularly-scheduled elections.

Results

State-by-state

Upper houses

Lower houses

Results

Territorial chambers

Lower houses

Unicameral

Total

|- align=center
! colspan="2"  style="background:#e9e9e9; text-align:center;"|Political Party
! style="background:#e9e9e9;"|Previous total
! style="background:#e9e9e9;"|New total
! style="background:#e9e9e9;"|Net change
! style="background:#e9e9e9;"|% of Seats
|-
| 
|3,282||3,890||+680||52.7%
|-
| 
|4,022||3,342||-680||45.3%
|-
| 
|56||60||+4||0.008%
|-
| 
|6||6||0||0.0008%
|-
| 
|2||1||-1||0.0001%
|}

Notes

References

 
 
State legislative elections
State legislature elections in the United States by year